Alfredo Pérez may refer to:
Alfredo Pérez (boxer) (born 1952), retired Venezuelan boxer
Alfredo Pérez (fencer) (born 1972), Venezuelan fencer
Alfredo Pérez (footballer) (1929–1994), Argentine football defender